The Squash - Single Men competition at the World Games 2005 took place from July 16 to July 19 in Duisburg in Germany.

Seeds

Draw

Note: * w/d = Withdraw, * w/o = Walkover, * r = Retired

References

Men
Squash records and statistics